Defending champion Shingo Kunieda defeated Stéphane Houdet in the final, 6–1, 6–0 to win the men's singles wheelchair tennis title at the 2015 French Open. It was his sixth French Open singles title and 19th major singles title overall, and he dropped just three games en route.

Seeds

Draw

Finals

References
 Draw

Wheelchair Men's Singles
French Open, 2015 Men's Singles